Listing Impossible is a television series that premiered on CNBC in January 2020.

See also

 2020 in American television

References

2020 American television series debuts
2020 American television series endings
CNBC original programming
Television series by Authentic Entertainment